Thaddeus Jarosz (June 24, 1910 – March 29, 1974) was an American boxer. He held the world middleweight boxing championship from 1934–1935.

Early life
Yarosz was born the second of eight children on the North side of Pittsburgh, but when he was ten his family moved to Monaca, Pennsylvania, a suburb twenty-six miles away.  His father died when he was only sixteen, putting economic pressure on him and his brothers.  He quit school at seventeen to train for a boxing career to earn wages for his family along with his older brother Ed Yarosz.  His brother Tommy was a boxer, as was his brother Victor, and his older brother Ed became an amateur boxer prior to Teddy who first put on a pair of gloves around twelve. His brother Joe won an all-service welterweight tournament during his time in the military.  Teddy was known as a strong defensive boxer, and though he never recorded many knockouts, he lost only one bout by knockout against  Babe Risko in January 1935.

Professional boxing career
Yarosz became a professional boxer in 1929.  He would eventually be trained by the legendary Ray Arcel and managed by Ray Fouts.  

On August 21, 1933, Yarosz won the Pennsylvania version of the world middleweight title from Vince Dundee in ten rounds before 15,000 at Pittsburgh's Forbes Field. Yarosz annoyed Dundee with frequent left jabs to the face and scored repeatedly with rights to the jaw.  In the second, Yarosz had Dundee against the ropes for over a half minute, and scored with lefts and rights to both the head and face with little return.  In the ninth, Dundee took a strong offensive stand, but was too exhausted to do much damage to Yarosz.

Yarosz defended the Pennsylvania version of the middleweight title against Jimmy Smith on February 12, 1934, winning in a fifteen-round unanimous decision before a crowd of 5,000 in Pittsburgh. Yarosz took the offense through most of the long bout, and there were no knockdowns by either competitor.  Yarosz dominated the fighting in the eleventh and twelfth. Smith forced the fighting in the thirteenth through fifteenth rounds, but was ineffective against the left of Yarosz.  The United Press gave Yarosz all but the first, second, ninth, and thirteenth.  The blows of Smith were well defended by Yarosz with his gloves and elbows, while Yarosz continuously shot through his left and connected nearly every time.

Taking the world middleweight title

As a rising star, Yarosz was featured on the cover of the January 1934 issue of The Ring magazine. He took the NYSAC World Middleweight Title and National Boxing Association World Middleweight Title with a fifteen-round decision over Vince Dundee before a crowd of 28,000 at Forbes Field, on 11 September 1934 in his native Pittsburgh.  The bout was close but somewhat dull due to too much wrestling and clinching, though Yarosz seemed to hold the lead in all but the late rounds when he looked visibly exhausted.  Yarosz was awarded eight rounds to Dundee's four, with three even.  He scored well with long range blows to the head of Dundee, who seemed to focus more on Yarosz's midsection.  Dundee was down three times during the bout, once falling out of the ropes in round three.

Yarosz defended the Pennsylvania version of the middleweight title on April 6, 1934 against former world middleweight champion Ben Jeby, winning in a twelve-round points decision in Pittsburgh.  Yarosz was most effective with right hand smashes to the jaw and body of Jeby, who was never given the chance to fight inside where he usually excelled.  The Pittsburgh Press gave Yarosz nine rounds, with one to Jeby and two even.

Losing the world middleweight title
Yarosz lost both the NBA and NYSAC middleweight title to Eddie Babe Risko who defeated him on September 19, 1935 in Pittsburgh in fifteen rounds before a crowd of 25,000.  Risko knocked Yarosz to the mat twice for counts of nine in the sixth and seventh rounds, and several judges gave Yarosz only the first round. Yarosz made his best showing in the eighth but did not appear to win any other round on points.  In the ninth, Yarosz was stunned by a blow beneath his heart which caused him to clinch, and after the third had received frequent pounding to his midsection.  Yarosz injured his right knee in the fourth round or possibly earlier, and had surgery two months later to repair it.  

After his loss to Risko, the legendary trainer Ray Arcel worked with Yarosz for months to rehabilitate his knee, heating and massaging it, and supervising his work with weights.

On September 21, 1936, Yarosz defeated Risko for the first time in a close ten round split decision, demonstrating the skills of his trainer and the depths of his recovery from his knee injury.  Yarosz showed a definite advantage from the first round, scoring with roundhouse swings, and shining in the seventh where he pummeled the slower moving Risko.

Unfazed by his loss of the title, Yarosz scored an impressive victory over future world middleweight champion Solly Krieger on January 13, 1937 in a ten-round unanimous decision in New York.  Yarosz took seven rounds to three for Krieger. 

Yarosz defeated former world welter and middleweight champion Lou Brouillard on May 7, 1937 in a ten-round points decision before 2,438 in Boston.  With a darting left and a lightning fast right cross, Yarosz gained a large enough margin on points to take the decision.  Brouillard offered strong opposition through the entire bout taking at least two rounds with strong body blows to Yarosz's middle, but his crouching southpaw defense was penetrated too often to even the scoring.  In the tenth, Brouillard opened with a strong two fisted attack that had Yarosz retreating, but was knocked down for a count of two with a right before the round ended.   

On June 6, 1938, Georgie Abrams defeated Yarosz in a ten-round split decision at Griffith Stadium in Washington, D.C.  

Yarosz lost to the skilled, youthful opponent Billy Conn, another boxer trained by Ray Arcel, on June 30, 1937 in a close twelve round split decision before 13,874 at Forbes Field in Pittsburgh.  Yarosz started the first three rounds on offense, scoring heavily with hooks, jabs, and right crosses.  Conn looked stronger in the fourth and fifth, scoring with lefts and rights to the head and body.  For the sixth through tenth, the well matched duo boxed cautiously, until the final two rounds where both boxers slugged it out, often toe to toe. The excited fans protested the close decision, though Conn was credited with taking the middleweight championship of Pennsylvania.  On September 30, 1937, Yarosz lost again to Conn in an equally close fifteen round split decision before 9,000 at Duquesne Gardens in Pittsburgh.  Yarosz boxed a smart fight in the first seven rounds, building up a significant points margin.  But in the remainder of the long bout, Conn caught up and went ahead on points with a brutal body attack and an occasional right and left to the face that exhausted the older Yarosz who became nearly helpless in the closing rounds.  In a fight that had been slow and methodical, the fourteenth opened when Conn dealt a blow to Yarosz's head that made it difficult for him to complete the round, and though he managed, he had little strength left in the fifteenth.  Yarosz defeated Conn only once on July 25, 1938, in a twelve-round unanimous decision before a crowd of 10,800 at Forbes Field in Pittsburgh.  According to the Pittsburgh Press the bout included kidney punching and low left hooks from Conn, and thumbing, gouging and heeling from the gloves of Yarosz. Both fighters, out of anger, continued fighting after the second and fifth rounds.  Yarosz outboxed Conn in the last few rounds and Conn was unable to find a remedy or an adequate defense.  Yarosz was awarded seven rounds, with just one to Conn, with the seventh even.   

In a July 5, 1938 rating of American middleweights, Yarosz was still placed in the top ten by the Cincinnati Enquirer, remaining in top contention for a four-year period, if not the majority of his later career.

Future NYSAC world middleweight champion Ken Overlin fell to Yarosz, on March 27, 1939 in a ten-round points decision in Houston. Dominating with his left, the United Press gave seven rounds to Yarosz with only two to Overlin and one even.

Yarosz defeated Archie Moore, future light heavyweight champion, on April 20, 1939 in a ten-round unanimous decision in St. Louis.  He used his always present left to deliver and ward off blows, and took the close with the help of a low blow penalty that cost Moore a round.  Only in the seventh and eighth was Moore able to penetrate the defenses of Yarosz.

Retirement from boxing and later life
He married Eugenia Lesniak of Lawrenceville, Pennsylvania in 1940.

After retiring from boxing in 1942, he operated a bar called "Teddy's Inn" in Potter Township and worked for a while as a policeman. After the war years, he worked as a caster at the Aliquippa Works of the Jones and Laughlin steel corporation until his death.

Death
Yarosz died after a six-month battle with cancer on March 29, 1974 at Beaver Medical Center in Rochester, Pennsylvania, a mile and a half North of his home in Monica, where he had been a member of St. John's Church.  He was buried in nearby St. John's Cemetery and was survived by his wife, four sons and a daughter. He was inducted into the International Boxing Hall of Fame for the Class of 2006.

Professional boxing record
All information in this section is derived from BoxRec, unless otherwise stated.

Official record

All newspaper decisions are officially regarded as “no decision” bouts and are not counted in the win/loss/draw column.

Unofficial record

Record with the inclusion of newspaper decisions in the win/loss/draw column.

Boxing achievements

References

External links
 

1910 births
1974 deaths
Boxers from Pittsburgh
Middleweight boxers
World middleweight boxing champions
International Boxing Hall of Fame inductees
American people of Polish descent
American male boxers
People from Monaca, Pennsylvania